Daniel Krezic (born 3 May 1996) is a professional footballer who plays as a forward for Cork City in the League of Ireland Premier Division. Born in Sweden, he represents North Macedonia internationally.

Club career
On 23 January 2022, Krezic signed a two-year contract with Degerfors.

Krezic signed for League of Ireland Premier Division club Cork City on 1 February 2023.

References

External links
 

1996 births
Living people
Varbergs BoIS players
IK Oddevold players
Degerfors IF players
Cork City F.C. players
Ettan Fotboll players
Superettan players
Allsvenskan players
League of Ireland players
Macedonian footballers
North Macedonia youth international footballers
Association football forwards
Footballers from Gothenburg
Expatriate association footballers in the Republic of Ireland